Brent R. Carter (born September 28, 1948) is an American professional poker player from Oak Park, Illinois who has won two World Series of Poker bracelets.  He lives in Oak Park, IL.

Poker career
Carter first finished in the money of a World Series of Poker (WSOP) event in 1991 in the $1,500 seven-card stud event. He won his first bracelet the same year in the $1,500 No Limit Texas hold 'em event, defeating O'Neil Longson in the final heads-up confrontation. He won a second bracelet in 1994 at the $1,500 limit Omaha event.  Carter also won a Hall of Fame tournament bracelet in Ace-to-Five Lowball Draw.

Carter finished in the money of the WSOP $10,000 No Limit Texas Hold'em main event in 1991 (15th), 1992 (31st), and 1995 (3rd).

In 1995 and 1996, Carter won the Best All-Around Player Award at the Four Queens Poker Classic.

On September 10, 2008, Carter, who uses the name '92848' on PokerStars, won a World Championship of Online Poker bracelet in event #11, a $320 buy-in Pot-Limit Omaha Hi/Lo tournament. He bested a field of 1,733 players to win the $88,383 first prize.

As of 2009, his total live tournament winnings exceed $2,900,000. His 46 cashes at the WSOP account for $1,286,821 of those winnings.

World Series of Poker bracelets

References

1948 births
Living people
American poker players
World Series of Poker bracelet winners
People from Oak Park, Illinois
People from Treasure Island, Florida